Civer is a ghost town in Fulton County, Illinois, United States.  Its elevation was 679 feet (207 m).  The community no longer exists.

References

Ghost towns in Illinois
Geography of Fulton County, Illinois